The Zoche aero-diesels are a trio of radical German prototype diesel radial aero-engines intended for light aircraft, designed by Michael and Georg Zoche in the 1990s.  Zoche aero-diesels are modular piston engines and are all direct-drive, air-cooled, radial two-stroke diesels with up to four cylinders per row. They all feature direct fuel-injection, two-stage charging (turbocharger and supercharger), and intercooling. In each plane (or row), all the pistons connect to a single throw on the crankshaft.

The testing and gestation period of the Zoche engines has already lasted over 25 years; and whether or when production may eventually start is unknown. However, in 2019, Georg Zoche posted this message online: "Don't worry and remain patient; we are working on it".

Design and development
The  range comprises three radial engines, namely: a "cross-4"; a twin-row "cross-8"; and a V-twin. As yet, there are no plans for a 3-cylinder version.

The AOPA website explains the "cross-4" ZO 01A as follows: "The radial design was chosen for its ability to be effectively air-cooled and 100% balanced at all rpm with a simple counterweight system. All four connecting rods are attached to a single crankshaft throw. This prevents any crankshaft twisting, which is hard to balance out in opposed-configuration engines. Zoche engines use a pneumatic starting system that does away with the need for a heavy-duty starter and battery system".  Propeller rotation is clockwise (viewed from the cockpit).  Engine mountings are attached to the cylinder heads.  Engines are to be certified to JAR-E and FAR 33, and a TBO of 2,000 hours is anticipated.

The founder of the project is Michael Zoche, who claims that the ZO engines will have the following advantages:  
 they will be lightweight, compact (with low frontal area) and very smooth; 
 low fuel consumption; high power-to-weight ratio; 
 the lubrication system will allow aerobatics; 
 diesel fuel injection, so no carburetor icing; 
 direct-driven generator, so no drive belts; 
 good reliability through a low part count and absence of poppet valves; 
 pneumatic starting obviates both electric starter motor and heavy starter battery; 
 complete absence of rubber hoses; cheaper parts through modularity; 
 reduced fire risk compared to avgas;
 good power output, even at altitudes up to 9,000 feet (3,000 m).  
 the engines will also have a "classic radial" appearance that is appropriate for some aircraft types.

A Zoche engine has run effectively in wind tunnel tests, but Zoche seem barely any closer to production than they were a in 2010. Experimental engine manufacturers seem to experience difficulties in proceeding beyond the prototype stage. The cited engine weights include: starter-generator, hydraulic propeller-governor, turbocharger and supercharger, and oil- and fuel-filters.

Zoche engine variants 
 ZO 01A
Single-row cross-4, (max)  @ 2500 rpm), fuel consumption 21 litres/h @ 75% power.

 ZO 02A
Double-row cross-8, (max)  @ 2500 rpm), fuel consumption 42 litres/h @ 75% power.

 ZO 03A
V-twin, (max)  @ 2500 rpm), fuel consumption 10 litres/h @ 75% power.

 ZO 04A
A  compound diesel engine for use in the Sentinel 5000 airship on vectoring mounts.

A consequence of the modular design, with all engines sharing parts (such as an intercooler), is that the larger engines have a much higher power to weight ratio than the smaller engines, as follows:
The 8 cylinder ZO 01A claims 2.43 bhp per kilogram;
The 4 cylinder ZO 02A claims 1.78 bhp per kilogram;
The 2 cylinder ZO 03A claims 1.27 bhp per kilogram.

Lambert Mission
The Lambert Mission 212, a kit-built 4-seat aircraft from Belgium, was initially designed around the Zoche ZO1A engine; but, with the non-appearance of the Zoche, Lambert were obliged to select other engines, the DeltaHawk® DH200A4 (or DH180A4), or the XP-360 engine.  In May 2010 the second M212 Mission (and first kit-built example) was successfully flown.

See also

References

External links
 www.zoche.de — Zoche site

Patents:
 Application filed by Michael 8000 Muenchen De Zoche DE 4020826
 Diesel engine EP 0231223 
 Turbocharged diesel engine US 4781028
 Radial internal combustion engine US 5197416 
 Japan 63-500818

Air-cooled aircraft piston engines
Aircraft radial diesel engines
1990s aircraft piston engines